The New Walk Centre was a council office block in Leicester, United Kingdom, that was demolished on 22 February 2015.

The complex consisted of two towers, built in 1975 and owned by Leicester City Council. After they were declared unsafe in 2010, the buildings were demolished by Birmingham-based contractors DSM Demolition. The demolition was to make way for a new mixed use development procured by Leicester City Council. The development began construction in 2016.

References

Buildings and structures in Leicester
Office buildings completed in 1975
Buildings and structures demolished in 2015
Buildings and structures demolished by controlled implosion
1975 establishments in England
2015 disestablishments in England